Jomhod Eminentair (จอมโหด อีมิเน้นท์แอร์) is a Thai Muay Thai fighter.

Titles and accomplishments
Regional
Isan Region 55 lbs Champion
OneSongchai
2007 S1 World 105 lbs Champion
Channel 7 Boxing Stadium
2008 Channel 7 Stadium 108 lbs Champion
2014 Channel 7 Stadium 115 lbs Champion (defended twice)
2018 Channel 7 Stadium 115 lbs Champion (defended three titmes)
 2022 Channel 7 Stadium 115 lbs Champion
M-ONE
2013 M-ONE 122 lbs Champion
 Rajadamnern Stadium
2015 Rajadamnern Stadium 115 lbs Champion

Fight record

|-  style="background:#cfc;"
| 2023-03-10|| Win ||align=left| Daniel Gyllenberg ||  ONE Friday Fights 8, Lumpinee Stadium || Bangkok, Thailand || TKO (punches + elbows)  ||  2 ||1:05 
|-  style="background:#fbb;"
| 2022-07-17|| Loss ||align=left| Rak Erawan || Channel 7 Boxing Stadium ||Bangkok, Thailand|| Decision|| 5 ||3:00 
|-
! style=background:white colspan=9 |
|-  style="background:#fbb;"
| 2022-04-23|| Loss||align=left| Ryan Sheehan || Siam Warriors || Cork City, Ireland || Decision (Split) ||5 ||3:00
|-
! style=background:white colspan=9 |
|-  style="background:#cfc;"
| 2022-03-06|| Win ||align=left| Chusap Sor.Salacheep || Channel 7 Boxing Stadium ||Bangkok, Thailand|| Decision|| 5 ||3:00 
|-
! style=background:white colspan=9 |
|-  style="background:#CCFFCC;"
| 2021-12-19 || Win ||align=left| SingUdon Gor.Soytan || Kiatpetch Amarin Super Fight, Rajadamnern Stadium|| Bangkok, Thailand|| KO  || 2 || 
|-  style="background:#fbb;"
| 2021-04-24 || Loss ||align=left| Chokpanlan Por.Lakboon || Channel 7 Boxing Stadium ||Bangkok, Thailand|| Decision|| 5 || 3:00 
|-
! style=background:white colspan=9 |
|-  style="background:#cfc;"
| 2021-03-06 || Win||align=left| Theut Powerhouse || Muay Hardcore ||Bangkok, Thailand|| KO (right uppercut) || 2 || 2:08
|-  style="background:#cfc;"
| 2020-12-10 || Win||align=left| Phetsommai Sor.Sommai || Rajadamnern Stadium ||Bangkok, Thailand|| Decision|| 5 || 3:00
|-  style="background:#cfc;"
| 2020-09-06 || Win||align=left| Kiew Parunchai || Muay Jet Si, Channel 7 Boxing Stadium ||Bangkok, Thailand|| Decision|| 5 || 3:00 
|-
! style=background:white colspan=9 |
|-  style="background:#fbb;"
| 2020-02-09|| Loss||align=left|  Kiew Parunchai ||Srithammaracha + Kiatpetch Super Fight || Nakhon Si Thammarat, Thailand ||Decision|| 5 || 3:00
|-  style="background:#CCFFCC;"
| 2019-12-18|| Win ||align=left| Seeoui Singmawin || Rajadamnern Stadium || Bangkok, Thailand || KO || 1 ||
|-  style="background:#CCFFCC;"
| 2019-09-15 || Win ||align=left| Watcharapon PkSaenchaigym || Samui Festival + Kiatpetch|| Koh Samui, Thailand|| Decision || 5 || 3:00
|-  style="background:#CCFFCC;"
| 2019-08-11 || Win ||align=left| Kiew Parunchai || Nonthaburi Stadium || Nonthaburi, Thailand|| Decision || 5 || 3:00
|-  style="background:#CCFFCC;"
| 2019-06-23 || Win ||align=left| Ongree Sor Dechapan || Channel 7 Boxing Stadium || Bangkok, Thailand|| Decision || 5 || 3:00 
|-
! style=background:white colspan=9 |
|-  style="background:#CCFFCC;"
| 2019-05-12 || Win ||align=left|  Superjeng Sor.SamarnGarment || Channel 7 Boxing Stadium || Bangkok, Thailand|| Decision || 5 || 3:00
|-  style="background:#FFBBBB;"
| 2019-04-14 || Loss ||align=left|  Superjeng Sor.SamarnGarment || Chang MuayThai Kiatpetch Super Fight || Si Sa Ket, Thailand|| Decision || 5 || 3:00
|-  style="background:#FFBBBB;"
| 2019-02-12 || Loss||align=left| Kompetch Sitsarawatsuer || Lumpinee Stadium || Bangkok, Thailand|| Decision || 5 || 3:00
|-  style="background:#FFBBBB;"
| 2018-12-07|| Loss ||align=left| Rungnarai Kiatmuu9 || Lumpinee Stadium || Bangkok, Thailand || Decision || 5 || 3:00 
|-
! style=background:white colspan=9 |
|-  style="background:#CCFFCC;"
| 2018-11-11|| Win ||align=left|  Borkhuu Mega || Muay Thai Super Champ || Bangkok, Thailand || Decision || 3 || 3:00
|-  style="background:#CCFFCC;"
| 2018-09-09 || Win ||align=left| Watcharapon PkSaenchaigym ||Channel 7 Boxing Stadium || Bangkok, Thailand|| Decision || 5 || 3:00 
|-
! style=background:white colspan=9 |
|-  style="background:#CCFFCC;"
| 2018-05-27|| Win ||align=left| Wanchalong PK.Saenchai || Channel 7 Boxing Stadium || Bangkok, Thailand || TKO || 2 || 
|-
! style=background:white colspan=9 |
|-  style="background:#FFBBBB;"
| 2018-05-01|| Loss ||align=left| Watcharapon PkSaenchaigym || Lumpinee Stadium || Bangkok, Thailand || Decision || 5 || 3:00
|-  style="background:#CCFFCC;"
| 2018-04-04|| Win ||align=left| Palangpon PechyindeeAcademy || Rajadamnern Stadium || Bangkok, Thailand || Decision || 5 || 3:00
|-  style="background:#CCFFCC;"
| 2018-01-28 || Win ||align=left| Watcharapon PkSaenchaigym ||Channel 7 Boxing Stadium || Bangkok, Thailand|| Decision || 5 || 3:00
|-  style="background:#FFBBBB;"
| 2017-11-25 || Loss ||align=left| Petchphusang KeelaSport ||Kriatpetch Super Fight || Bangkok, Thailand|| KO|| 5 ||
|-  style="background:#FFBBBB;"
| 2017-09-10 || Loss ||align=left|  Jakdao Petkiatpetch ||Channel 7 Boxing Stadium || Bangkok, Thailand|| Decision || 5 || 3:00
|-  style="background:#CCFFCC;"
| 2017-06-17 || Win ||align=left|  Petchphusang KeelaSport || || Laos|| KO|| 4 ||
|-  style="background:#FFBBBB;"
| 2017-05-13 || Loss||align=left|  Petchphusang KeelaSport ||Lumpinee Stadium || Bangkok, Thailand|| Decision || 5 || 3:00
|-  style="background:#CCFFCC;"
| 2017-03-21 || Win ||align=left|  Watcharapon PkSaenchaigym ||Lumpinee Stadium || Bangkok, Thailand|| Decision || 5 || 3:00
|-  style="background:#FFBBBB;"
| 2017-02-10|| Loss||align=left| Watcharapon PkSaenchaigym || Lumpinee Stadium ||Bangkok, Thailand || Decision  || 5 || 3:00
|-  style="background:#CCFFCC;"
| 2017-01-14|| Win||align=left| Aikwayu Mor.Krungthepthonburi || Lumpinee Stadium ||Bangkok, Thailand || Decision  || 5 || 3:00
|-  style="background:#c5d2ea;"
| 2016-12-16|| Draw||align=left| Aikwayu Mor.Krungthepthonburi || Lumpinee Stadium ||Bangkok, Thailand || Decision  || 5 || 3:00
|-  style="background:#FFBBBB;"
| 2016-11-19|| Loss||align=left| Yokmorakot Wor.Sanprapai || Lumpinee Stadium ||Bangkok, Thailand || Decision  || 5 || 3:00
|-  style="background:#FFBBBB;"
| 2016-08-08|| Loss||align=left| Yothin FA Group || Rajadamnern Stadium ||Bangkok, Thailand || Decision  || 5 || 3:00
|-  style="background:#CCFFCC;"
| 2016-07-29|| Win||align=left| Kengkla Por.Pekko || Lumpinee Stadium ||Bangkok, Thailand || KO|| 2 ||
|-  style="background:#CCFFCC;"
| 2016-07-01|| Win ||align=left| Wanchalong PK.Saenchai || 80th Anniversary Commemoration Stadium ||Nakhon Ratchasima, Thailand || Decision  || 5 || 3:00
|-  style="background:#CCFFCC;"
| 2016-05-29|| Win ||align=left| Phonkit Tor.Ieowjaroentong || Jitmuangnon Stadium ||  Bangkok, Thailand || Decision  || 5 || 3:00
|-  style="background:#CCFFCC;"
| 2016-04-08|| Win ||align=left| Wanchalong PK.Saenchai ||  || Khon Kaen, Thailand || Decision  || 5 || 3:00
|-  style="background:#FFBBBB;"
| 2016-02-14|| Loss||align=left|  Kengkla Por.Pekko || Channel 7 Boxing Stadium || Bangkok, Thailand || Decision  || 5 || 3:00
|-  style="background:#FFBBBB;"
| 2015-11-29|| Loss ||align=left| Wanchalong PK.Saenchai || Channel 7 Boxing Stadium || Bangkok, Thailand || Decision  || 5 || 3:00
|-
! style=background:white colspan=9 |
|-  style="background:#CCFFCC;"
| 2015-10-13|| Win||align=left| Wanchalong PK.Saenchai || Lumpinee Stadium || Bangkok, Thailand || Decision  || 5 || 3:00
|-  style="background:#CCFFCC;"
| 2015-09-04|| Win||align=left| Saknarinnoi Or.Auansuwan|| Lumpinee Stadium || Bangkok, Thailand || KO || 3 ||
|-  style="background:#CCFFCC;"
| 2015-08-06|| Win||align=left| Chaisiri Saknirunrath|| Rajadamnern Stadium || Bangkok, Thailand || Decision  || 5 || 3:00
|-
! style=background:white colspan=9 |
|-  style="background:#FFBBBB;"
| 2015-06-05|| Loss||align=left| Kengkla Por.Pekko|| Lumpinee Stadium || Bangkok, Thailand || Decision  || 5 || 3:00
|-
! style=background:white colspan=9 |
|-  style="background:#CCFFCC;"
| 2015-05-03|| Win||align=left| Saknarinnoi Or.Auansuwan|| Channel 7 Boxing Stadium || Bangkok, Thailand || Decision  || 5 || 3:00
|-
! style=background:white colspan=9 |
|-  style="background:#CCFFCC;"
| 2015-03-08|| Win||align=left| Splinter Pangkongprab|| Channel 7 Boxing Stadium || Bangkok, Thailand || Decision  || 5 || 3:00
|-
! style=background:white colspan=9 |
|-  style="background:#c5d2ea;"
| 2015-02-03|| Draw ||align=left| Wanchalong PK.Saenchai || Lumpinee Stadium || Bangkok, Thailand || Decision  || 5 || 3:00
|-  style="background:#CCFFCC;"
| 2014-11-09|| Win||align=left| Wanchalong PK.Saenchai || Channel 7 Boxing Stadium || Bangkok, Thailand || Decision  || 5 || 3:00
|-
! style=background:white colspan=9 |
|-  style="background:#CCFFCC;"
| 2014-10-07|| Win||align=left| Chaisiri Saknirunrath|| Lumpinee Stadium || Bangkok, Thailand || Decision  || 5 || 3:00
|-  style="background:#CCFFCC;"
| 2014-09-05|| Win||align=left|  Pichitchai PKSaenchaigym ||Lumpinee Stadium || Bangkok, Thailand ||Decision  || 5 || 3:00
|-  style="background:#FFBBBB;"
| 2014-08-08|| Loss||align=left|  Kengkla Por.Pekko || Lumpinee Stadium || Bangkok, Thailand || Decision  || 5 || 3:00
|-  style="background:#CCFFCC;"
| 2014-07|| Win||align=left| Chaykhom Sitjakhan || Channel 7 Boxing Stadium || Bangkok, Thailand || Decision  || 5 || 3:00
|-  style="background:#CCFFCC;"
| 2014-04-18|| Win||align=left| Serbin Kiatjaroenchai ||Lumpinee Stadium || Bangkok, Thailand || KO || 2 ||
|-  style="background:#FFBBBB;"
| 2014-02-11|| Loss||align=left|  Yokpet Yodasawintransport || Lumpinee Stadium || Bangkok, Thailand || Decision  || 5 || 3:00
|-  style="background:#CCFFCC;"
| 2013-11-19 || Win||align=left|  Pentai Sitnumnoi || Lumpinee Stadium || Bangkok, Thailand || Decision || 5 || 3:00
|-  style="background:#CCFFCC;"
| 2013-10-25|| Win||align=left| Talatkek Saksamrit|| Lumpinee Stadium || Bangkok, Thailand || KO (Left Straight) || 3 ||
|-  style="background:#FFBBBB;"
| 2013-10-03|| Loss||align=left| Panpayak Jitmuangnon || Rajadamnern Stadium || Bangkok, Thailand || Decision || 5 || 3:00
|-  style="background:#CCFFCC;"
| 2013-09-12|| Win||align=left| Pet Or Pimonsee  || Rajadamnern Stadium || Bangkok, Thailand || KO (Left Hook)|| 2 ||
|-  style="background:#FFBBBB;"
| 2013-07-29|| Loss||align=left| Trakunpet Sor Sommai  || Rajadamnern Stadium || Bangkok, Thailand || Decision || 5 || 3:00
|-  style="background:#CCFFCC;"
| 2013-05-16 || Win||align=left| Romie Adanza || M-One: Reborn || Highland, California, United States || TKO (cut) || 1 || 1:21
|-
! style=background:white colspan=9 |
|-  style="background:#CCFFCC;"
| 2013-04-28 || Win||align=left|  Pentai Sitnumnoi ||  Bangla Stadium || Phuket, Thailand || Decision || 5 || 3:00
|-  style="background:#CCFFCC;"
| 2013-04-05 || Win||align=left|  Kusagonnoi Sor.Joonsen || Lumpinee Stadium || Bangkok, Thailand || KO  || 3 ||
|-  style="background:#CCFFCC;"
| 2013-02-05 || Win||align=left|  Pentai Sitnumnoi || Lumpinee Stadium || Bangkok, Thailand || Decision || 5 || 3:00
|-  style="background:#FFBBBB;"
| 2012-10-05 || Loss||align=left|  Pentai Sitnumnoi || Lumpinee Stadium || Thailand || Decision || 5 || 3:00
|-  style="background:#FFBBBB;"
| 2012-08-11 || Loss||align=left|  Pentai Sitnumnoi ||  || Thailand || Decision || 5 || 3:00
|-  style="background:#FFBBBB;"
| 2008-12-09|| Loss||align=left| Wanheng Menayothin || Lumpinee Stadium || Bangkok, Thailand || Decision  || 5 || 3:00
|-  style="background:#CCFFCC;"
| 2008|| Win||align=left|  Namphet Sor Tarntip || Channel 7 Boxing Stadium || Bangkok, Thailand || Decision  || 5 || 3:00
|-
! style=background:white colspan=9 |
|-  style="background:#CCFFCC;"
| 2007-03-22|| Win||align=left|  Namphet Sor Tarntip ||  || Bangkok, Thailand || TKO|| 2||
|-  style="background:#FFBBBB;"
| 2006-09-22|| Loss||align=left| Wanheng Menayothin || Lumpinee Stadium || Bangkok, Thailand || Decision  || 5 || 3:00
|-
! style=background:white colspan=9 |
|-  style="background:#fbb;"
| 2006-10-28|| Loss||align=left| Palangpon Piriyanopachai || Onesongchai || Bangkok, Thailand || KO || 2 ||
|-  style="background:#CCFFCC;"
| 2006-08-31|| Win||align=left| Palangpon Piriyanopachai ||  || Bangkok, Thailand || Decision  || 5 || 3:00
|-  style="background:#CCFFCC;"
| 2006-08-14|| Win||align=left| Sipatanalak Kiat Por Chaideat || Rajadamnern Stadium || Bangkok, Thailand || Decision  || 5 || 3:00
|-  style="background:#CCFFCC;"
| 2006-07-05|| Win||align=left| Sudpatapee Deatrat || Rajadamnern Stadium || Bangkok, Thailand || Decision  || 5 || 3:00
|-  style="background:#CCFFCC;"
| 2005-12-22|| Win||align=left| Werachai P.Muangtungsong|| Rajadamnern Stadium || Bangkok, Thailand || TKO || 2 ||
|-  style="background:#CCFFCC;"
| 2005-08-19|| Win||align=left| Nongbew S.Sinchai ||  || Bangkok, Thailand || Decision  || 5 || 3:00
|-  style="background:#CCFFCC;"
| 2005-07-28|| Win||align=left| Tawanchai Sakhirunchai ||  || Bangkok, Thailand || KO || 2 ||
|-  style="background:#CCFFCC;"
| 2005-06-27|| Win||align=left| Werachai P.Muangtungsong ||  || Bangkok, Thailand || KO|| 4 ||
|-  style="background:#CCFFCC;"
| 2005-06-06|| Win||align=left| Lukhai S.Panajerphet ||  || Bangkok, Thailand || Decision  || 5 || 3:00
|-  style="background:#CCFFCC;"
| 2004-11-11|| Win||align=left|  Tewarath Kiatyongyut ||  || Bangkok, Thailand || Decision  || 5 || 3:00
|-  style="background:#FFBBBB;"
| 2004-05-20|| Loss||align=left|  Petchsanguan Sitniwat ||  || Bangkok, Thailand || Decision  || 5 || 3:00
|-
| colspan=9 | Legend:

References

Jomhod Eminentair
Living people
1988 births
Jomhod Eminentair